The Inland Waterways Association of Ireland (IWAI) is a registered charity and a limited company in the Republic of Ireland and also operates in Northern Ireland. It was founded in 1954 to campaign for the conservation and development of the waterways and their preservation as working navigations. As of 2008, the association had approximately 4,400 members which were organised in twenty branches.

IWAI has links with the Scottish Inland Waterways Association (SIWA), with an annual exchange. In 2008, SIWA visited Lough Erne.

Publications
The group publishes a quarterly magazine called Inland Waterway News (IWN). It contains news about the Irish waterways along with articles from the various branches/ subgroups that make up the organisation.

Activities
The IWAI and its subgroups host rallies over the Summer months annually. These rallies include the Shannon rally, Lough Derg rally and Lough Erne rally. The Shannon rally is the biggest of these rallies. In the bigger rallies, participants may pay a fee to take part. The rallies may include tests of boating skills, rescue exercises, a table quiz, fancy dress competitions, with awards ceremonies at the end. Some of the smaller branches hold small boat rallies with dingies. Branches that hold these are Boyne Navigation IWAI, Newry and Portadown IWAI and Lagan IWAI.

Branches

 Athlone
 Barrow
 Belturbet
 Boyle River
 Boyne Navigation
 Carrick-on-Shannon
 Coalisland
 Corrib
 Cruising Club
 Dublin
 Lough Derg
 Lough Erne
 Kildare
 Lagan
 Newry and Portadown
 North Barrow
 Offaly
 Powerboat Branch
 Shannon Harbour
 Slaney
 River Bann and Lough Neagh

See also
Canals of Ireland
Waterways Ireland

References

External links

Statuary Inland waterways authority in Ireland

Charities based in the Republic of Ireland
Organizations established in 1954
1954 establishments in Ireland
All-Ireland organisations
Inland waterways under restoration